Sufism is the Islamic mysticism.

Sufism may also refer to:

Sufism topics
 History of Sufism, a history of Islamic mysticism.
 International Association of Sufism, a nonprofit organization established to open a line of communication among Sufis all around the world
 Philosophical sufism, the schools of thought in Sufism
 Sufism poetry, a mystic poetry in Sufism
 Western Sufism,  a new religious movement in the world

Sufism by country
 Sufism in Afghanistan
 Sufism in Algeria
 Sufism in Bangladesh
 Sufism in India
 Sufism in Jordan
 Sufism in Pakistan
 Sufism in Punjab
 Sufism in Sindh
 Sufism in South Asia (disambiguation)
 Sufism in the United States

See also 
 
 
 Sufi (disambiguation)
 Sufian (disambiguation)